Køge is a seaport town in Denmark.

Koge may also refer to:

Kogé, Benin
Kōge, Fukuoka, Japan
Kōge, Tottori, a former town in Japan

See also
Køge Municipality, the second-level Danish administrative division which contains the town of Køge
Koge station (disambiguation)